Maciej Rosiewicz (born 31 July 1977) is a Polish race walker representing Georgia. He competed in the 50 kilometres walk event at the 2012 Summer Olympics.

In 2011, Rosiewicz obtained Georgian citizenship and is representing Georgia since then.

References

Polish male racewalkers
Male racewalkers from Georgia (country)
1977 births
Living people
Olympic athletes of Georgia (country)
Athletes (track and field) at the 2012 Summer Olympics
Place of birth missing (living people)
World Athletics Championships athletes for Georgia (country)